Father Griffins is a Gaelic Athletic Association club based in Galway, Ireland. The club is a member of the Galway GAA. Father Griffins are a Gaelic football club.

Before their Amalgamation with Éire Óg, Father Griffins experienced regular success in Galway from their founding in 1948 until their final County title in 1975. They have also won the Connacht Senior Club Football Championship twice in their history, failing at the semi-final stage of the All-Ireland Senior Club Football Championship on both occasions.

History

Early Foundations
On 14 February 1948 the following item appeared in the (now defunct) Galway Observer:

“A very enthusiastic meeting of Gaels was held recently at the C.Y.M.S. Hall, Galway for the purpose of forming a football club in the city.  After a lengthy discussion the plans were made for the formation of the club, which will be known as the Fr Griffin G.F.C.  Many meetings have taken place and it has been decided to affiliate a senior and a junior team in the current year’s championship.  If there are any interested and wish to become members of the club they should contact any member of the committee or write to the Hon. Secretary.  Great strides have been taken to ensure success and so far the seeds of a good senior team have been laid.  The following have been appointed –

Chairman:                          John Daly

Vice-Chairman:                   Stephen Lally

Secretary:                          Sean Kindillon “Gracedieu”

Treasurer:                          Jimmy Ward

Committee:                        Austin Roache, JJ Walsh, Paddy Fitzmaurice, Tom Brady.

Mick Lynch and Willie Naughton have been appointed board Delegates.

Club Name
The clubs was named after Fr. Michael Griffin. Born in Gurteen, Ballinasloe, he was ordained at Maynooth in 1917 and was transferred from Ennistymon, Co Clare to the parish of Rahoon in Galway City in June 1918.

At the age of 28 he was lured to his death by the British Forces on the night of 14 November 1920.  On Saturday 20 November his body was found in a bog near Barna.  He had been shot through the head.  The following Tuesday morning after solemn requiem mass the start of the funeral journey took place through the streets of Galway.  It was one of the largest ever seen with 3 bishops, 150 priests and in excess of 12,000 mourners participating, as the city he loved paid its last farewell to the dead priest.

When a group of enthusiasts gathered together in Galway in the spring of 1948 to form a football club they unanimously agreed to call that club Fr Griffins.

Achievements
That was the first public announcement of the formation of the Fr Griffins Gaelic Football Club.  Nobody at that time, not even the founders of the club, realised that one of the city's greatest ever Gaelic Football Clubs had come into being. Griifins are the only city club to win three senior championships in a row, to have won the senior football title on seven occasions, the only city club to win the Connacht Championship on two occasions. Fr Griffins have also won the Senior League and County Championships at juvenile, minor and under twenty-one levels.

Famous Players
All-Ireland Senior Football Medal Winners

1956 - Joe Young, Aidan Swords, Joe Looney

1964 - Johnny Geraghty, Martin Newell, Tom Sands, Kieran O’Connor

1965 - Johnny Geraghty, Martin Newell, Tom Sands

1966 - Johnny Geraghty, Martin Newell, Colie McDonagh, Liam Sammon, Tom Sands

All-Ireland Junior Football Medal Winners

1958 - Paddy Dunne

1965 - Kieran O’Connor, Colie McDonagh, Tom Sands, Frank Heaney, Eddie Geraghty

All-Ireland Under 21 Football Medal Winners

1972 - Barney Costelloe

All-Ireland Minor Football Medal Winners

1952 - Eugene Dunleavy

1960 - Johnny Geraghty

1976 - Kieran Smith

Texaco Football of the Year

1965 - Martin Newell

All-Star Awards

1971 - Liam Sammon

1973 - Liam Sammon

Club Amalgamation
Two Galway City Gaelic Football clubs have just announced that they are amalgamating for a trial period of two years. Éire Óg and Fr. Griffins will jointly enter all City and County competitions at all age levels including juvenile and adult football. The move comes after weeks of intensive discussions involving both clubs and the Galway County Board.

The Éire Óg club has catered for players in the Headford Road, Castlelawn, Tirellan, Ballinfoyle, Menlo and Castlegar areas. Fr. Griffins has catered for players in the College Road, Lough Atalia, Forster Street, the City Centre, Bohermore, Woodquay, Claddagh, Riverside, Glenburren and Tuam Road areas. The new club will now cater for players from all of these areas.

The amalgamation was brought about because of the declining demographics in the City centre area. Recent census figures show a continuing decline in the number of children under 14 years of age. Over time this would affect the ability of each club to field teams at a number of age levels.

"This is a very significant move for Gaelic football in Galway City" says Johanna Downes, Chairperson of the Éire Óg club. "I believe the coming together of the two clubs will greatly strengthen Gaelic football in this part of the city. Both clubs are bringing significant strengths to the new organisation. We hope to build on these strengths to make Fr. Griffins – Éire Óg a powerful force in Galway football. The new club will be very dynamic and will offer improved opportunities to young people and adults alike to partake in the sport."

"We are very pleased at this link up" says Myles Mc Hugh, Chairman of Fr. Griffins. "We have seen the decline in numbers playing football over the past few years. This has been due to the lack of families living in the city centre area. This move allows us to improve the quality of participation for all involved. The recent discussions with Éire Óg and the County Board have been very successful and I am looking forward to the upcoming season. I would like to acknowledge the support given by Galway County Board. The new club will be investing in significant coaching resources for the forthcoming season with the assistance of Galway GAA."

The new club is wasting no time in getting organised. A Registration Day is being held on Saturday next 10 May in the Menlo Park Hotel from 2pm to 4pm. All existing members of both clubs should attend. New members living in the catchment area are also invited to attend. The club is especially anxious that parents or other interested adults should come along.

The following are the current officers of the amalgamated club. Joint Presidents Johanna Downes & Mick Sullivan, Chairperson: Thomas Cox, Vice Chair: Tom Costello, Secretary: John Walsh, Assistant Secretary: Mary Burke, Treasurer: Matthew Deane, Coaching Officer: Alan Campbell,  Registrar: Tommy Roddy, PRO: Myles McHugh/Tommy Roddy & TJ Cox, Juvenile Football: Alan Campbell & Cian Hynes, Junior Football: Mark Gilmore & Thomas Cox,   Summer Camp coordinators: Alan Campbell, Mike Burke, Cian Hynes.

Honours
Galway Senior Club Football Championships: 7
1948, 1949, 1950, 1967, 1970, 1972, 1975
Connacht Senior Club Football Championship: 2
1970, 1972

External links

 Official Fr Griffin's Éire Óg GAA Club Website

Gaelic football clubs in County Galway
Gaelic games clubs in County Galway
Sport in Galway (city)
1948 establishments in Ireland